Ntando Mahlangu (born 26 January 2002) is a South African Paralympic athlete. He won the gold medal in both the men's long jump T63 and men's 200 metres T61 events at the 2020 Summer Paralympics in Tokyo, Japan.

He won the silver medal in the men's 200 metres T42 event at the 2016 Summer Paralympics in Rio de Janeiro, Brazil. He is also a two-time medallist at the World Para Athletics Championships.

Personal life 

Mahlangu was born with fibular hemimelia, which affected the development of both his legs below the knee. In 2012, it was decided to amputate both his legs at the knee. Later that year he received his first set of blades from South African Charity Jumping Kids. He attended primary school at Laerskool Constantiapark and high school at Afrikaanse Hoër Seunskool (Affies) in Pretoria.

Career 

Early in his career, he competed as a T42-classified athlete. Mahlangu represented South Africa at the 2016 Summer Paralympics held in Rio de Janeiro, Bazi where he on the slver meal in te men's 200 metres T42 event at the age of 14.

At the 2017 World Para Athletics Championships in London, United Kingdom, he won the silver medal in the men's 200 metres T42 event. He also competed in the men's 100 metres T42 event, where he did not advance to compete in the final. At the beginning of 2018, World Para Athletics implemented classification changes and, as of that year, he competes as a T61-classified athlete, a class specifically for athletes with double above-the-knee amputation.

At the 2019 World Para Athletics Championships in Dubai, United Arab Emirates, he won the gold medal in the men's 200 metres T61 event and finished fourth in the men's long jump T63 event. He qualified to represent South Africa at the 2020 Summer Paralympics in Tokyo, Japan. In April 2021, Mahlangu set a new world record of 22.94 seconds in the men's 200 metres T61 final at the 2021 South African Sports for the Physically Disabled (SASAPD) National Championships in Gqeberha, South Africa.

Mahlangu won the gold medal in the men's long jump T63 event at the 2020 Summer Paralympics held in Tokyo, Japan, setting a new world record of 7.17 m. He also won the gold medal in the men's 200 metres T61 event.

In 2020, he starred in the Netflix documentary film Rising Phoenix.

Achievements

Track

Field

References

External links 
 

Living people
2002 births
Place of birth missing (living people)
Paralympic athletes of South Africa
Athletes (track and field) at the 2016 Summer Paralympics
Athletes (track and field) at the 2020 Summer Paralympics
Medalists at the 2016 Summer Paralympics
Medalists at the 2020 Summer Paralympics
Paralympic gold medalists for South Africa
Paralympic silver medalists for South Africa
Paralympic medalists in athletics (track and field)
South African male long jumpers
South African male sprinters
South African amputees
Medalists at the World Para Athletics Championships
21st-century South African people